

QJ51A Tetracyclines for intramammary use

QJ51AA Tetracyclines
QJ51AA03 Chlortetracycline
QJ51AA06 Oxytetracycline
QJ51AA07 Tetracycline
QJ51AA53 Chlortetracycline, combinations

QJ51B Amphenicols for intramammary use

QJ51BA Amphenicols
QJ51BA01 Chloramphenicol
QJ51BA02 Thiamphenicol
QJ51BA90 Florfenicol

QJ51C Beta-lactam antibacterials, penicillins, for intramammary use

QJ51CA Penicillins with extended spectrum
QJ51CA01 Ampicillin
QJ51CA51 Ampicillin, combinations

QJ51CE Beta-lactamase sensitive penicillins
QJ51CE01 Benzylpenicillin
QJ51CE09 Procaine penicillin
QJ51CE59 Procaine penicillin, combinations
QJ51CE90 Phenetamate

QJ51CF Beta-lactamase resistant penicillins
QJ51CF01 Dicloxacillin
QJ51CF02 Cloxacillin
QJ51CF03 Meticillin
QJ51CF04 Oxacillin
QJ51CF05 Flucloxacillin

QJ51CR Combinations of pencillins and/or beta-lactamase inhibitors
QJ51CR01 Ampicillin and enzyme inhibitor
QJ51CR02 Amoxicillin and enzyme inhibitor
QJ51CR50 Combinations of penicillins

QJ51D Other beta-lactam antibacterials for intramammary use

QJ51DB First-generation cephalosporins
QJ51DB01 Cefalexin
QJ51DB04 Cefazolin
QJ51DB08 Cefapirin
QJ51DB10 Cefacetrile
QJ51DB90 Cefalonium

QJ51DC Second-generation cephalosporins
QJ51DC02 Cefuroxime

QJ51DD Third-generation cephalosporins
QJ51DD12 Cefoperazone
QJ51DD90 Ceftiofur

QJ51DE Fourth-generation cephalosporins
QJ51DE90 Cefquinome

QJ51E sulfonamides and trimethoprim for intramammary use

QJ51EA Trimethoprim and derivatives
QJ51EA01 Trimethoprim

QJ51F Macrolides and lincosamides for intramammary use

QJ51FA Macrolides
QJ51FA01 Erythromycin
QJ51FA02 Spiramycin
QJ51FA90 Tylosin

QJ51FF Lincosamides
QJ51FF90 Pirlimycin
QJ51FF02 Lincomycin

QJ51G Aminoglycoside antibacterials for intramammary use

QJ51GA Streptomycins
QJ51GA90 Dihydrostreptomycin

QJ51GB Other aminoglycosides
QJ51GB03 Gentamicin
QJ51GB90 Apramycin

QJ51R Combination of antibacterials for intramammary use

QJ51RA Tetracyclines, combinations with other antibacterials
QJ51RA01 Chlortetracycline, combinations with other antibacterials

QJ51RB Amphenicols, combinations with other antibacterials
QJ51RB01 Chloramphenicol, combinations with other antibacterials

QJ51RC Beta-lactam antibacterials, penicillins, combinations with other antibacterials
QJ51RC04 Procaine penicillin, dihydrostreptomycin, sulfadimidin
QJ51RC20 Ampicillin, combinations with other antibacterials
QJ51RC21 Pivampicillin, combinations with other antibacterials
QJ51RC22 Benzylpenicillin, combinations with other antibacterials
QJ51RC23 Procaine penicillin, combinations with other antibacterials
QJ51RC24 Benzathine benzylpenicillin, combinations with other antibacterials
QJ51RC25 Penethamate hydroiodide, combinations with other antibacterials
QJ51RC26 Cloxacillin, combinations with other antibacterials

QJ51RD Other beta-lactam antibacterials, combinations with other antibacterials
QJ51RD01 Cefalexin, combinations with other antibacterials
QJ51RD34 Cefacetrile, combinations with other antibacterials

QJ51RE Sulfonamides and trimethoprim including derivatives
QJ51RE01 Sulfadiazine and trimethoprim

QJ51RF Macrolides and lincosamides, combinations with other antibacterials
QJ51RF01 Spiramycin, combinations with other antibacterials
QJ51RF02 Erythromycin, combinations with other antibacterials
QJ51RF03 Lincomycin, combinations with other antibacterials

QJ51RG Aminoglycoside antibacterials, combinations
QJ51RG01 Neomycin, combinations with other antibacterials

QJ51RV Combinations of antibacterials and other substances
QJ51RV01 Antibacterials and corticosteroids
QJ51RV02 Antibacterials, antimycotics and corticosteroids

QJ51X Other antibacterials for intramammary use

QJ51XB Polymyxins
QJ51XB01 Colistin
QJ51XB02 Polymyxin B

QJ51XX Other antibacterials for intramammary use
QJ51XX01 Rifaximin

References

J51